Big Brother Albania 5 was the fifth season of the Albanian series of the worldwide franchise of Big Brother. It launched on Saturday, 18 February 2012, with fifteen housemates entering the house. The winner received the 15,000,000 Leks (€100,000) prize.
The fifth season of Big Brother Albania aired on two cable and satellite channels 24 hours a day on the Digit-Alb TV network, as well as on two additional channels on DigitAlb Mobile. Daily reviews were shown Monday through Saturday on Top Channel. The eviction show aired on Saturdays at 21:00 CET, while a Sunday edition closed off the week.
The main host is Arbana Osmani, while Albana Osmani hosted the Sunday morning spin-off called "Big Brother Albania Fans' Club", featuring dialogues with eliminated contestants and fans of the show. Arian Konomi returned this year and took over the role of the panelist for the third time, thus replacing Blendi Salaj. The winner of the season is Arbër Zeka. The fifth season of Big Brother Albania is known for being the most controversial one to date, it is known also for its numerous fights between the houseguests and the breakdown of a drug-addicted houseguest during the show.

Housemates

Nominations table

Notes

: Gentiana was chosen by Big Brother to evict one of three boys: Meti, Ermal or Elvis. She evicted Meti and then the public voted whether Meti should stay in the house or should be evicted. 94.6% of the public voted for Meti to stay in the house. Then all girls were nominated and the public voted for its favorite housemate. Emirjeta had the smallest percentage of votes (7%), so she left the house. After that, all boys were nominated and the boy with the smallest percentage of votes was Gjon.
: All of the housemates were nominated for eviction and the three housemates with the fewest votes would be evicted and four others would be nominated. As Albulena, Florian, and Arjola received the fewest votes to save (1.3%, 2.4%, and 3.2%) they were all evicted while Anila, Elvis, Franceska and Graciano were nominated. Other housemates voted to save a housemate from being nominated. Graciano had three votes from other housemates, so he was saved.
: Ermira and Lorena were not official housemates and for this reason, the public voted to decide if they should stay or leave the house. Finally, they were saved with 75% of public votes.
: Graciano was automatically nominated by the rest of the housemates.
: The public voted for its favorite housemate. Ermal, Arbër, Graciano, Gentiana, Liam and Klaudja were voted the favorite housemates of the public so they could not be nominated for two weeks.
: All housemates except the exempt housemates and the new ones were nominated. The exempt housemates, Arbër, Ermal, Liam and Genta, had to save a nominated housemate. The not saved housemates were Anila, Graciano and Lorena.
: The housemates voted to nominate between Erion, Ermal and Gentiana as they never were nominated. Erion was the first nominee. Gentiana and Ermal were exempt next round.
: This round the female housemates were immune and they have to save a male housemate. The male who was not saved was nominated.
: Graciano had to choose his two best friends in the house to be nominated. He chose Erion and Grandiola. Then, the rest of the housemates had to choose who should be up for elimination. Grandiola received most votes.
: Housemates had to choose the first nominee between less favourite housemates Dritan, Erion, Gentiana, Gerta and Graciano.
: Arbër, Dritan, Gerta and Liam were automatically nominated by Big Brother for discussion about nominations.
: In this round there were at least two nominees, one by the public and the other by the housemates. Erion was chosen by the public.

References

External links
 

2012 Albanian television seasons
05